The turnip or white turnip (Brassica rapa subsp. rapa) is a root vegetable commonly grown in temperate climates worldwide for its white, fleshy taproot. The word turnip is a compound of turn as in turned/rounded on a lathe and neep, derived from Latin napus, the word for the plant. Small, tender varieties are grown for human consumption, while larger varieties are grown as feed for livestock. In Northern England, Scotland, Ireland, Cornwall and parts of Canada (Quebec, Newfoundland, Manitoba and the Maritimes), the word turnip (or neep) often refers to rutabaga, also known as swede, a larger, yellow root vegetable in the same genus (Brassica).

Description 

The most common type of turnip is mostly white-skinned apart from the upper , which protrude above the ground and are purple or red or greenish where the sun has hit. This above-ground part develops from stem tissue, but is fused with the root. The interior flesh is entirely white. The leaves grow directly from the above-ground shoulder of the root, with little or no visible crown or neck (as found in rutabagas).

Turnip leaves are sometimes eaten as "turnip greens" ("turnip tops" in the UK), and they resemble mustard greens (to which they are closely related) in flavor. Turnip greens are a common side dish in southeastern U.S. cooking, primarily during late Fall and Winter. Smaller leaves are preferred, but the bitter taste of larger leaves can be reduced by pouring off the water from the initial boiling and replacing it with fresh water. Varieties of turnip grown specifically for their leaves resemble mustard greens and have small or no storage roots. These include rapini (broccoli rabe), bok choy, and Chinese cabbage. Similar to raw cabbage or radish, turnip leaves and roots have a pungent flavor that becomes milder after cooking.

Size is partly a function of variety and partly a function of the length of time the turnip has grown. Most very small turnips (also called baby turnips) are specialty varieties. These are only available when freshly harvested and do not keep well. Most baby turnips can be eaten whole, including their leaves. Baby turnips are sold in yellow-, orange-, and red-fleshed varieties, as well as white-fleshed. Their flavor is mild, so they can be eaten raw in salads like radishes and other vegetables.

Nutrition 

The boiled greens are a rich source (more than 20% of the Daily Value, DV) particularly of vitamin K (350% DV), with vitamin A, vitamin C, and folate also in significant content (30% DV or greater, table). Boiled turnip greens also contain substantial lutein (8440 micrograms per 100 g).

In a 100-gram reference amount, boiled turnip root supplies , with only vitamin C in a moderate amount (14% DV). Other micronutrients in boiled turnip are in low or negligible content (table). Boiled turnip is 94% water, 5% carbohydrates, and 1% protein, with negligible fat.

History  
Wild forms of the turnip and its relatives, the mustards and radishes, are found over western Asia and Europe. Starting as early as 2000 BC, related oilseed subspecies of Brassica rapa like oleifera may have been domesticated several times from the Mediterranean to India, though these are not the same turnips cultivated for its roots. Furthermore, estimates of domestication dates are limited to linguistic analyses of plant names.

Edible turnips were possibly first cultivated in northern Europe, and were an important food in the Hellenistic and Roman world. The turnip eventually spread east to China, and reached Japan by 700 AD.

Turnips were an important crop in the cuisine of Antebellum America. They were grown for their greens as well as the roots, and could yield edible greens within a few weeks of planting, making them a staple of new plantations still in the process of becoming productive. They could be planted as late as the fall and still provide newly arrived settlers with a source of food. The typical southern way of cooking turnip greens was to boil them with a large chunk of "bacon". The broth obtained from this process was known as pot likker and was served with crumbled corn pone, often made from coarse meal when little else was available along the antebellum frontier.

Cultivation 

The 1881 American Household Cyclopedia advises that turnips can be grown in fields that have been harrowed, ploughed, and planted with turnip seed. It recommends planting in late May or June and weeding and thinning with a hoe throughout the summer.

As a root crop, turnips grow best in cool weather; hot temperatures cause the roots to become woody and bad-tasting. They are typically planted in the spring in cold-weather climates (such as the northern US and Canada) where the growing season is only 3–4 months. In temperate climates (ones with a growing season of 5–6 months), turnips may also be planted in late summer for a second fall crop. In warm-weather climates (7 or more month growing season), they are planted in the fall. 55–60 days is the average time from planting to harvest.

Turnips are a biennial plant, taking two years from germination to reproduction. The root spends the first year growing and storing nutrients, and the second year flowers, produces seeds, and dies. The flowers of the turnip are tall and yellow, with the seeds forming in pea-like pods. In areas with less than seven-month growing seasons, temperatures are too cold for the roots to survive the winter. To produce seeds,  pulling the turnips and storing them over winter is necessary, taking care not to damage the leaves. During the spring, they may be set back in the ground to complete their lifecycle.

Relevance in human use 
In England around 1700, Charles "Turnip" Townshend promoted the use of turnips in a four-year crop-rotation system that enabled year-round livestock feeding. In most of England, the smaller white vegetables are called turnips, while the larger yellow ones are referred to as swedes. In the United States, turnips are the same, but swedes are usually called rutabagas.

Heraldry 

The turnip is an old vegetable charge in heraldry. It was used by Leonhard von Keutschach, prince-archbishop of Salzburg. The turnip is still the heart shield in the arms of Keutschach am See.

The arms of the former municipality of Kiikala, Finland, were Gules, a turnip Or.

See also 
Daikon
 DCPA, a commonly used herbicide in the growing of turnips
 Kohlrabi, aka "German turnip"
 Celeriac, aka "turnip-rooted celery"
Nanakusa-no-sekku
Turnip Prize
Turnip Winter

References

External links 

 Multilingual taxonomic information from the University of Melbourne
 Alternative Field Crop Manual: Turnip

Brassica
Crops originating from Europe
Leaf vegetables
Root vegetables
Crops